The Citadel–Furman football rivalry is an American college football rivalry game played by The Citadel Bulldogs football team of The Citadel, The Military College of South Carolina and the Furman Paladins football team of Furman University.

History
The series dates to 1913, and has been played every year that both schools have fielded a football team since 1919, with only an interruption of 1943 through 1945 during World War II.  Furman dominated the early years of the rivalry, winning 27 of the first 34 contests, which also included three ties.  Since 1955, the series has been remarkably even, with many close, hard-fought games and three of overtime contests since 2005.

The Paladins and Bulldogs have alternated home sites for most of their history, with contests played twice at the Orangeburg County Fairgrounds in Orangeburg, South Carolina.  Furman won both games played in Orangeburg.

The rivalry is enhanced by the stark differences between the two schools: one a military college in coastal Charleston and the other a liberal arts college in upstate Greenville.  Many pranks were engineered by cadets and students, most memorably in 1963 when Citadel cadets kidnapped the horse that Furman's Paladin mascot rode during games.  While the tale was embellished by Pat Conroy, the horse survived but did not resume its mascot duties.

The series was an end of the season fixture on each team's schedule from 1965 through 1992, and returned to the last regular season weekend in 2012.  When The Citadel's other primary rival, VMI, departed the Southern Conference, Bulldog coaches worked to restore Furman as their primary rival in the minds of their players and fans.

Game results

Other varsity sports

Discontinued sports

See also  
 List of NCAA college football rivalry games
 List of most-played college football series in NCAA Division I

References

Furman
Citadel
Citadel vs Furman
1913 establishments in South Carolina